Vejle Amts Folkeblad is a regional Danish newspaper. It is now published by Jysl Gynske Medier.

History
The newspaper was first published on 20 October 1865 by Thomas Nielsen. Later that year, H Kleine bought the newspaper and the associated printing business from Nielsen. After Kleine's death in 1868, his widow published the paper for one year. 

In 1869, Nielsen and editor A. K. Jensen bought the paper. Jensen retired in 1882. After Nielsen's death in 1895 , the paper was published by a joint stock company.  In 1892, Chr. Søndergaard became editor in chief.  He was succeeded in 1933 by A. W. Johannessen.  In 1940,  G. Skytte Nielsen became editor-in-chief.

See also
 Vejle Amts Avis

References 

1865 establishments in Denmark
Newspapers published in Denmark
Danish-language newspapers
Newspapers established in 1865